Ullala may refer to:

 a village in the district of Kottayam, in the backwaters of Kerala, South India.
 Ullal, a town in Indian state of Karnataka.
 Ullala, a fictional character in the South Korean computer animated TV series Chiro
 Ullàlla, a music album by Antonello Venditti.